Visit California is a nonprofit organization self-tasked with developing and maintaining marketing programs to further develop tourism in  California. This organization was previously known as the California Travel & Tourism Commission before its reorganization.

Funding of the organization is through taxes (known as assessments) on tourism related businesses, such as hotels.

Visit California Awards
The annual Poppy Awards are a biennial contest to recognize the best of Californian tourism. Nomination criteria include that entries must promote tourism to/within California and that entries must demonstrate an impact on tourism.

See also
Tourism in California

References

External links
 Visit California

Organizations based in California
Tourism agencies
Tourism in California
1998 establishments in California